The coat of arms of Imperial College London is an heraldic emblem used by Imperial College London. Edward VII granted the college the arms on the 6 June 1908 by royal warrant. It is blazoned:

The open book with  inscribed was later adopted by the then-new New South Wales University of Technology in 1952. The historic constituent colleges, and their surviving constituent unions use their own emblems, with only the City and Guilds's emblem being a coat of arms. Many of the historic medical schools which merged to form Imperial College School of Medicine also had their own coat of arms, although these are no longer used. On 5 June 2020, the college decided to remove the motto from the official rendition of the coat of arms, to address issues of colonialism. This was part of a wider effort to address racial inequality in college provisions following the murder of George Floyd and the ensuing focus on the Black Lives Matter movement. The motto, "", which is translated as "Scientific knowledge, the crowning glory and the safeguard of the empire", had always traditionally been shown with the crest, being depicted as such by Fox-Davies as early as 1915. Unusually for an English university motto, it was granted with the coat of arms, which prevented it being updated instead of simply not shown.

Gallery

See also

 Armorial of UK universities
 Coat of arms of the United Kingdom
 English Heraldry § Educational Institutions
 History of Imperial College London

References

History of Imperial College London
Imperial College London
Imperial College London
Imperial College London
Imperial College London
Culture of Imperial College London